Grev is the Swedish equivalent of the German noble title Graf and can also refer to: 
 G.rev, a Japanese video game